The seventh season of Let's Dance began on 28 March 2014. Sylvie Meis and Daniel Hartwich returned as hosts. Motsi Mabuse, Joachim Llambi and Jorge Gonzalez returned as judges. For the first time, all judges return to the judging panel in the same constellation.

Couples

Judges scores

Red numbers indicates the lowest score for each week.
Green numbers indicates the highest score for each week.
 indicates the couple eliminated that week.
 indicates the returning couple that finished in the bottom two/three.
 indicates the winning couple.
 indicates the runner-up couple.
 indicates the third-place couple.

Averages 
This table only counts for dances scored on a traditional 30-points scale.

Highest and lowest scoring performances 
The best and worst performances in each dance according to the judges' marks are as follows:

Couples' Highest and lowest scoring performances
According to the traditional 30-point scale.

Weekly scores and songs
Unless indicated otherwise, individual judges scores in the charts below (given in parentheses) are listed in this order from left to right: Jorge Gonzalez, Motsi Mabuse and Joachim Llambi.

Week 1

Running order

Week 2

Running order

Week 3

Running order

Week 4

Running order

Week 5

Running order

Week 6 "Movie Night" 

Running order

Week 7  

Running order

Week 8  

Running order

Week 9  

Running order

Dance Chart

 Week 1: Cha-Cha-Cha, Waltz or Quickstep
 Week 2: Jive, Foxtrot or Contemporary
 Week 3: One unlearned dance (including Paso Doble and Rumba)
 Week 4: Bollywood, Charleston or Hip-Hop and Disco
 Week 5: One unlearned dance (including Tango and Samba) and Team Dance
 Week 6: Two unlearned dances
 Week 7: One unlearned dance and Freestyle
 Week 8: Two unlearned dances and Cha-Cha Dance-off
 Week 9: Final unlearned dance, Favorite dance and Freestyle

 Highest scoring dance
 Lowest scoring dance
 Danced, but not scored

Call-out order
The table below lists the order in which the contestants' fates were revealed. The order of the safe couples doesn't reflect the viewer voting results.

 This couple came in first place with the judges.
 This couple came in last place with the judges.
 This couple was eliminated.
 This couple came in last place with the judges and was eliminated.

Let's Dance (German TV series)
2014 German television seasons